Ouvrage Coume Annexe Sud is a lesser work (petit ouvrage) of the Maginot Line.  Located in the Fortified Sector of Boulay, the ouvrage consists of two infantry blocks, one artillery block and one observation block, and is located between petits ouvrages Coume and Mottemberg, facing Germany.

Design and construction 
The site was surveyed by CORF (Commission d'Organisation des Régions Fortifiées), the Maginot Line's design and construction agency; Coume was approved for construction in May 1931. It was completed at a cost of 13 million francs. The petit ouvrage  was to receive a separate entry block in a second phase, never carried out.

Description 
Coume Annexe Sud comprises four infantry blocks, connected by underground galleries, with a small underground utility area and barracks.
Block 1: Infantry block with one automatic rifle cloche (GFM) and one twin machine gun cloche (JM).
Block 2: Infantry block with one GFM cloche, one grenade launcher cloche (LG) and one twin machine gun cloche (JM).
Block 3: Entry/infantry block with two GFM cloches, one twin machine gun embrasure, one JM/AC47 embrasure and two 81mm mortar embrasures.
Block 4: Infantry/observation block with one GFM cloche, one JM cloche and one observation cloche (VDP).

Casemates and shelters 
In addition to the connected combat blocks, a series of detached casemates and infantry shelters surround Coume Annexe Sud, including
 Casemate du Bisterberg Nord I: SIngle armored block with two  mortar cloches and one GFM cloche.
 Casemate du Bisterberg Nord II: SIngle block with one JM/AC47 embrasure, one JM embrasure and one GFM cloche.
 Casemate du Bisterberg Sud III: SIngle block with one JM/AC47 embrasure, one JM embrasure and one GFM cloche.
 Casemate du Bisterberg Sud IIII: SIngle block with one JM/AC47 embrasure, one JM embrasure and one GFM cloche.

Manning 
The 1940 manning of the ouvrage under the command of Captain Faucoulanche comprised 194 men and 5 officers of the 160th Fortress Infantry Regiment. The units were under the umbrella of the 3rd Army, Army Group 2. The Casernement de Ban Saint-Jean provided peacetime above-ground barracks and support services to Coume Annexe Sudand other positions in the area.

History 
See Fortified Sector of Boulay for a broader discussion of the Boulay sector of the Maginot Line.
Coume Annexe Sud played no significant role in either the Battle of France in 1940 or the Lorraine Campaign of 1944.

See also 
 List of all works on Maginot Line
 Siegfried Line
 Atlantic Wall
 Czechoslovak border fortifications

Notes

References

Bibliography 
Allcorn, William. The Maginot Line 1928-45. Oxford: Osprey Publishing, 2003. 
Kaufmann, J.E. and Kaufmann, H.W. Fortress France: The Maginot Line and French Defenses in World War II, Stackpole Books, 2006. 
Kaufmann, J.E., Kaufmann, H.W., Jancovič-Potočnik, A. and Lang, P. The Maginot Line: History and Guide, Pen and Sword, 2011. 
Mary, Jean-Yves; Hohnadel, Alain; Sicard, Jacques. Hommes et Ouvrages de la Ligne Maginot, Tome 1. Paris, Histoire & Collections, 2001.  
Mary, Jean-Yves; Hohnadel, Alain; Sicard, Jacques. Hommes et Ouvrages de la Ligne Maginot, Tome 2. Paris, Histoire & Collections, 2003.  
Mary, Jean-Yves; Hohnadel, Alain; Sicard, Jacques. Hommes et Ouvrages de la Ligne Maginot, Tome 3. Paris, Histoire & Collections, 2003.  
Mary, Jean-Yves; Hohnadel, Alain; Sicard, Jacques. Hommes et Ouvrages de la Ligne Maginot, Tome 5. Paris, Histoire & Collections, 2009.

External links
 Coume (petit ouvrage A32 annexe sud de) at fortiff.be 
 Petit ouvrage de Coume Annexe Sud at lignemaginot.com 
 Petit ouvrage de Coume Annexe Sud at wikimaginot.eu 

Fortified sector of Boulay
Maginot Line

fr:Ouvrage du Village de Coume